Shahriar Kandeh (also Romanized as Shahrīār Kandeh) is a village in Miandorud-e Bozorg Rural District, in the Central District of Miandorud County, Mazandaran Province, Iran. At the 2006 census, its population was 1,464, in 391 families.

References 

Populated places in Miandorud County